Reginald Armour is a Trinidadian and Tobagonian lawyer who has served as Attorney General of Trinidad and Tobago since March 16, 2022. He was named by Prime Minister Keith Rowley to replace Faris Al-Rawi. Upon his appointment, questions were asked by opposition politicians about his ability to be appointed to the Senate in light of the fact that he was born in Dominica and therefore holds Dominican citizenship. The Constitution of Trinidad and Tobago states that "No person shall be qualified to be appointed as a Senator who is a citizen of a country other than Trinidad and Tobago having become such a citizen voluntarily or is under a declaration of allegiance to such a country". However, the legal consensus is that because Armour is a Dominican citizen through birth rather than naturalization, he is eligible to be appointed to the Senate. Before being named Attorney General, Armour served on the Eastern Caribbean Supreme Court and the Supreme Court of Trinidad and Tobago.

References 

Living people
Trinidad and Tobago lawyers
Attorneys General of Trinidad and Tobago
Year of birth missing (living people)